

Peerage of England

|rowspan="2"|Earl of Hereford (1067)||William FitzOsbern, 1st Earl of Hereford||1067||1072||Died
|-
|Roger de Breteuil, 2nd Earl of Hereford||1072||1074||Forfeit
|-
|Earl of Kent (1067)||Odo, Earl of Kent||1067||1088|| 
|-
|Earl of Cornwall (1068)||Robert, Count of Mortain||1068||1095|| 
|-
|Earl of Dorset (1070)||Osmund, Count of Seez||1070||1099||New creation
|-
|Earl of Norfolk (1070)||Ralph de Gael, 1st Earl of Norfolk||1070||1074||New creation; Forfeit
|-
|Earl of Chester (1071)||Hugh d'Avranches, 1st Earl of Chester||1071||1101||New creation
|-
|Earl of Northampton (1072)||Waltheof, 1st Earl of Northampton||1072||1075||New creation; Died
|-
|Earl of Shrewsbury (1074)||Roger de Montgomerie, 1st Earl of Shrewsbury||1074||1094||New creation

References

Lists of peers by decade
1070s in England
 
Peers